In archaeology, a tell, or tel (derived from , , 'hill' or 'mound'), is an artificial mound formed from the accumulated refuse or deposits of people living on the same site for hundreds or thousands of years. A classic tell looks like a low, truncated cone with sloping sides and can be up to 30 metres high.

Tells are most commonly associated with the archaeology of the ancient Near East, Southeast Europe (Bulgaria and Greece), also reaching Central Asia and West Africa. Within the Near East, they are concentrated in less arid regions, including Upper Mesopotamia, the Southern Levant, Anatolia and Iran.

Azerbaijan 

 Nargiztapa
 Govurqala, Nakhchivan
 Uzerliktapa
 Alikemek-Tepesi
 Kültəpə
 Baba-Dervish settlement
 Garakopaktapa
 Nakhchivan Tepe

Bulgaria 

 Tell Golemija ostrov (Durankulak lake)
 Tell Ezero
 Tell Karanovo
 Tell Solnitsata
 Tell Yunatsite

Egypt 

 Amarna
 Athribis
 Avaris
 Bubastis
 Buto
 Heliopolis (ancient Egypt)
 Kom Firin
 Leontopolis
 Mendes
 Pithom
 Tell El Kebir
 Tell el-Balamun
 Tell el-Qudeirat
 Tell Nebesha
 Thmuis

Gaza Strip 

 Tall al-Ajjul
 Tell El Sakan

Iran 

 Ali Kosh
 Chogha Bonut
 Chogha Golan
 Chogha Mish
 Ecbatana
 Fire Temple of Bahram
 Ganj Dareh
 Ganj Par
 Godin Tepe
 Haft Tepe
 Hajji Firuz Tepe
 Kuzaran
 Marlik
 Noushijan
 Rahmatabad Mound
 Salaleh
 Shahr-e Sukhteh
 Tall-i Bakun
 Tepe Hissar
 Tepe Sialk
 Tepe Yahya
 Teppe Hasanlu
 Teppe Zagheh

Iraq 

 Adab (city)
 Abu Salabikh
 Bakr Awa
 Citadel of Erbil
 Dur-Kurigalzu
 Gird-î Qalrakh
 Jemdet Nasr
 Mane (ancient city)
 Nineveh
 Rapiqum
 Tel Abib
 Tel Keppe
 Tell Agrab
 Tell al-Fakhar
 Tell al-Rimah
 Tell al-'Ubaid
 Tell Arpachiyah
 Tell Bazmusian
 Tell Begum
 Tell el-'Oueili
 Tell es-Sawwan
 Tell Hassuna
 Tell Ishchali
 Tell Khaiber
 Tell Maghzaliyah
 Tell Shemshara
 Tell Taya
 Tell Uqair
 Telul eth-Thalathat
 Tepe Gawra
 Yarim Tepe

Israel 

 Abel-beth-maachah
 Achziv
 Adullam
 Antipatris
 Ashdod
 Ashkelon National Park
 Azekah
 Beit She'an
 Beit Shemesh
 Dan (ancient city)
 Ein Gedi
 Ekron
 Gath (city)
 Gezer
 Gibeah
 Hurvat Itri
 Jezreel (city)
 Kedesh
 Khirbet et-Tibbaneh
 Khirbet Kerak
 Kinneret (archaeological site)
 Masil al-Jizl
 Rebbo
 Sokho
 Tel Arad
 Tel Be'er Sheva
 Tel Dor
 Tel Hazor
 Tel Kabri
 Tel Lachish
 Tel Megiddo
 Tel Rehov
 Tel Shikmona
 Tel Yokneam
 Tell Beit Mirsim
 Tell el-Hesi
 Tell es-Safi
 Tell Keisan
 Tell Qasile
 Yavne
 Yavne-Yam

Jordan 

 Amman Citadel
 Tall Jawa
 Tall Zira'a
 Tell Abu al-Kharaz
 Tell el-Fukhar (Jordan)
 Tell Hammeh
 Tell Johfiyeh
 Tell Mar Elias

Lebanon 

 Ancient Tell
 Sarepta
 Tell Aalaq
 Tell Ablah
 Tell Addus
 Tell Ahle
 Tell Ain Cerif
 Tell Ain el Meten
 Tell Ain Ghessali
 Tell Ain Nfaikh
 Tell Ain Saouda
 Tell Ain Sofar
 Tell Ayoub
 Tell Bar Elias
 Tell Beshara
 Tell Bir Dakoue
 Tell Deir
 Tell Delhamieh
 Tell Derzenoun
 Tell Dibbine
 Tell el-Burak
 Tell El Ghassil
 Tell El Hadeth
 Tell Fadous
 Tell Hazzine
 Tell Hoch Rafqa
 Tell Jisr 
 Tell Karmita
 Tell Khardane
 Tell Kirri
 Tell Jezireh
 Tell Kabb Elias
 Tell Majdaloun
 Tell Masoud
 Tell Mekhada
 Tell Meouchi
 Tell Mureibit
 Tell Murtafa
 Tell Nahariyah
 Tell Neba'a Chaate
 Tell Neba'a Litani
 Tell Qasr Labwe
 Tell Rasm El Hadeth
 Tell Rayak
 Tell Saatiya
 Tell Safiyeh
 Tell Saoudhi
 Tell Serhan
 Tell Shaikh Hassan al Rai
 Tell Shamsine
 Tell Sultan Yakoub
 Tell Taalabaya
 Tell Wardeen
 Tell Zenoub
 Tell Zeitoun

Syria 

 Al-Rawda (tell)
 Baliḫu
 Citadel of Aleppo
 Ebla
 Gamla
 Homs
 Mari, Syria
 Mureybet
 Qatna
 Tell Abu Hureyra
 Tell Afis
 Tell al-'Abr
 Tell al-Mishrifeh (Qatna)
 Tell al-Salihiyah
 Tell Aqab
 Tell Arbid
 Tell Ashtara
 Tell Banat
 Tell Barri
 Tell Beydar
 Tell Brak
 Tell Chuera
 Tell Danith
 Tell eth-Thadeyn
 Tell Ezou
 Tell Fekheriye
 Tell Fray
 Tell Ghoraifé
 Tell Hadar
 Tell Halaf
 Tell Halula
 Tell Kashfahan
 Tell Kazel
 Tell Khazzami
 Tell Leilan
 Tell Marj
 Tell Mashnaqa
 Tell Qaramel
 Tell Qarassa
 Tell Qarqur
 Tell Ramad
 Tell Sabi Abyad
 Tell Sukas
 Tell Taban
 Tel Tamer
 Tell Tuneinir
 Tell Tweini
 Tell Zeidan
 Urkesh
 Zahiran

Turkey 

 Alalakh
 Göbekli Tepe
 Gürcütepe
 Çatalhöyük
 Hisarlik (Troy)
 Kültepe
 Sultantepe
 Tell Judaidah 
 Tell Tayinat

UAE 

 Tell Abraq

West Bank 

 Et-Tell
 Jericho
 Khirbet Tibnah
 Shiloh (biblical city)
 Tell Balata
 Tell en-Nasbeh
 Tell es-Sultan

See also 
Tell (archaeology)
 List of tells in Lebanon
The archaeological hills in Erbil

References 

Tells